Two human polls and a committee's selections comprised the 2016 National Collegiate Athletic Association (NCAA) Division I Football Bowl Subdivision (FBS) football rankings, in addition to various publications' preseason polls. Unlike most sports, college football's governing body, the NCAA, does not bestow a national championship, instead that title is bestowed by one or more different polling agencies. There are two main weekly polls that began in the preseason—the AP Poll and the Coaches Poll. One additional poll was released midway through the season; the College Football Playoff (CFP) rankings are released after the eighth week.

This was the third season of the four-team College Football Playoff system which replaced the previous Bowl Championship Series system. At the conclusion of the regular season, on Sunday, December 4, 2016, the final CFP rankings determined who would play in the two bowl games designated as semifinals for the 2017 College Football Playoff National Championship on January 9, 2017, at Raymond James Stadium in Tampa, Florida.

Legend

AP Poll

Coaches Poll

CFP rankings

References

Rankings
NCAA Division I FBS football rankings
Rankings